The 2014 BMW Malaysian Open was a women's tennis tournament played on outdoor hard courts. It was the 5th edition of the Malaysian Open and was an International tournament on the 2014 WTA Tour. The tournament took place from April 14 to 20 at the Royal Selangor Golf Club. This tournament had been discontinued, but was restarted when the rights were bought off the tournament in Palermo, Italy.

Points and prize money

Point distribution

Prize money

Singles main-draw entrants

Seeds

1 Rankings are as of April 7, 2014.

Other entrants 
The following players received wildcards into the singles main draw:
  Eleni Daniilidou
  Jarmila Gajdošová 
  Zhang Ling

The following players received entry from the qualifying draw:
  Duan Yingying
  Giulia Gatto-Monticone
  Eri Hozumi
  Lyudmyla Kichenok
  Pemra Özgen
  Ana Vrljić

Withdrawals
Before the tournament
  Melinda Czink --> replaced by Danka Kovinić
  Andrea Hlaváčková --> replaced by Kristýna Plíšková
  Jovana Jakšić --> replaced by Akgul Amanmuradova
  Luksika Kumkhum --> replaced by Zheng Saisai
  Venus Williams --> replaced by Aleksandra Krunić

Retirements
  Kimiko Date-Krumm (left calf injury)

Doubles main-draw entrants

Seeds 

 Rankings are as of April 7, 2014.

Other entrants 
The following pairs received wildcards into the doubles main draw:
  Alyssa Boey /  Yang Zi
  Çağla Büyükakçay /  Pemra Özgen

The following pair received entry as alternates:
  Hsieh Shu-ying /  Arina Rodionova

Withdrawals 
Before the tournament
  Kimiko Date-Krumm (left calf injury)

Finals

Singles 

  Donna Vekić defeated  Dominika Cibulková, 5–7, 7–5, 7–6(7–4)

Doubles 

  Tímea Babos /  Chan Hao-ching defeated  Chan Yung-jan /  Zheng Saisai, 6–3, 6–4

References

External links
 Official website

Malaysian Open
Malaysian Open (tennis)
2014 in Malaysian tennis